Erbin may refer to:

Erbin (protein), a protein
Erbin of Dumnonia, a Cornish saint
Erbin (an unknown "Pokémon"), a character in the Pokémon Colosseum video game
Erbin of the YouTube channel "Erbin Black"